Nematollah Azmoodeh (7 July 1939 – 11 November 2005), better known as Nematollah Aghasi, and better known as Aghasi or  was an Iranian singer and songwriter. He was one of the most notable pre-Revolution singers. oldest daughter mahsa aghasi azmoodeh

Early life 
Aghasi was born on 21 July 1939 in Ahvaz. He was interested in sports and was active in the Taj Club of Ahvaz. As a young man, he began to read music. His songs include ("Amane" ) and ("Labeh kaaroon" ). After his successful performances in Laleh-Zar, he was the first Laleh-Zari singer to have his voice broadcast on Iranian National Radio and Television.

Cinematic activity 
Aghasi also worked as a film actor. He was invited to working in cinema by Manouchehr Nozari. He has recorded ten films throughout his career.

Film Actor
  (1977)
  (1977)
  (1975)
  (1974)
  (1973)
  (1972)
  (1972)
  (1971)
  (1971)
  (1970)

Music department
  (singer)
  (singer)
  (singer)
  (singer)
  (singer)
  (singer)

Last Aghasi concert 
Two years before his death, Nematollah Aghasi was allowed to return to the Pars Theater in Laleh-Zar, where he began his artistic career, for the first time since the Revolution. The event was so welcomed that the city closed the street in celebration.

Death 
He died of a stroke at his home in Karaj, and he was buried in Emamzadeh Taher cemetery.

Albums 
  (ننه نعمت)
  (خیلی ممنون)
  (آمنه)
  (مطرب پیر)
  (ایوالله)
  (میخوام برم به اهواز)
  (آغاسی)
  (هدیه می کند)

Discography

Single Songs 

 Afsaneh
 Akharin Negah
 Ashti
 Bia Barimesh
 Del Shodeh Yek Kaseh Khoon
 Dokhtare in Shahr
 Ghaliche
 Gol Nesar
 Meyhana Iraqi
 Nazi Nazi
 Sar Pol Dezfil
 Shir Ali Mardoon
 Vavaeyla Leili
 Dokhtareh Abadani
 Dokhtre Bala
 Delgir
 Rosva
 Rooze Jomeh
 Shab Cheragh
 Shab Karoon

Re-performing his songs by other artists 
Vaveyla Leyli was one of the songs played on Iranian Voice and television. A cover of this song was also released in 2012 by Shahram Shabpareh.

Joint concert with Andy in America 
Andranik Madadian and Nematollah Aghasi once performed Ameneh in a joint US concert

Gallery

References

External links 

Nematollah Aghasi At SourehCinema
Nematollah Aghasi At IranSong
List of pre-revolutionary Aghasi songs
Nematollah Aghasi At Spotify

20th-century Iranian male singers
Singers from Tehran
Persian-language singers
Iranian music historians
Burials at Emamzadeh Taher
Iranian pop singers
2005 deaths
1939 births
Iranian male singers
People from Ahvaz
People from Karaj
Male actors from Tehran
Iranian male film actors
Iranian classical singers
Caltex Records artists
Iranian folk singers
Iranian singer-songwriters